Okoslavci is a settlement in the Municipality of Radenci in northeastern Slovenia.

There is a chapel-shrine in the settlement by the side of the road leading to Kapelski Vrh. It was built in 1925 and has a small belfry.

References

External links
Okoslavci on Geopedia

Populated places in the Municipality of Radenci